Richard Bowen Loftin (born June 29, 1949), better known as R. Bowen Loftin, is an American academic and the former chancellor of the University of Missouri in Columbia, Missouri. He came to Missouri in 2013 after serving as the 24th President of Texas A&M University.

Biography

Early life
Loftin was born in Hearne, Texas.  He graduated from Texas A&M University in three years with a degree in physics, with highest honors, in 1970, and was a staff member of the MSC Student Conference on National Affairs. He earned a master's degree (1973) and Ph.D. (1975) in physics from Rice University.

Career
Prior to being appointed interim president, he served as the vice president and CEO of Texas A&M University at Galveston, where he also held the position of professor of maritime systems engineering. In fall 2008, when Hurricane Ike hit the Texas Gulf Coast, Loftin oversaw evacuation of the multi-site campus and relocation of almost all of the 1,500 students, along with many of the faculty and staff, to the main Texas A&M campus in College Station, approximately 150 miles inland. This is believed to be the first time that an entire institution of higher education was transposed onto another for an extended period of time.

He previously served at Old Dominion University as professor of electrical and computer engineering and professor of computer science, and also was responsible for graduate programs in modeling and simulation. He also served as executive director of the Virginia Modeling, Analysis and Simulation Center. Previously, he chaired the Department of Computer Science and was director of the NASA Virtual Environments Research Institute at the University of Houston.

Loftin is a consultant in modeling and simulation, advanced training technologies, and scientific/engineering data visualization. He is the author or co-author of more than 100 publications and has served as principal investigator in grants and contracts totaling millions of dollars. He has received awards for teaching and research excellence.

MU Deans met with UM System President Timothy Wolfe on October 9 and 13 to ask for Loftin's resignation. On October 21, the Curators met behind closed-doors in what was speculated by some to be related to be proceedings about Loftin's role in shutting down ties between Planned Parenthood and MU. State Rep. Caleb Jones, R-Columbia, speculated on Twitter that Loftin would be fired for his role in shutting down MU's connections to Planned Parenthood. On November 3, The MU English department faculty unanimously voted no confidence for Loftin. Then on November 9, nine deans called on the UM System Board of Curators for Loftin's removal. Citing Loftin's handling of race and cultural issues, the firing of the dean of the School of Medicine, the abrupt cancellation of graduate student health insurance subsidies in August, and the elimination of the vice chancellor for health sciences, they wrote that Loftin had created a “toxic environment through threat, fear and intimidation." That same day, amid protests which culminated with the resignation of Wolfe earlier that day, Loftin announced that he would resign at the end of 2015 and take a research role at MU. On November 11, the Curators voted to hasten his departure from January 1 to be effective immediately. Loftin's responsibilities were transferred to Interim Chancellor Hank Foley. In his new role, Loftin's annual salary will be $337,500.

References

External links
Texas A&M University - Office of the President
University of Missouri - Office of the Chancellor

Living people
Texas A&M University faculty
Texas A&M University System
Presidents of Texas A&M University
Rice University alumni
1949 births
Leaders of the University of Missouri
People from Columbia, Missouri
University of Missouri physicists
Computer graphics researchers
Information visualization experts
Virtual reality pioneers
People from Hearne, Texas
Texas A&M University alumni